Kingscreek is an unincorporated community in Champaign County, in the U.S. state of Ohio.

History
Kingscreek was originally called Kingston, and under the latter name was platted around 1870. The present name is derived from nearby Kings Creek. A post office called Kings Creek was established in 1868, and remained in operation until 1909.

References

Unincorporated communities in Champaign County, Ohio
Unincorporated communities in Ohio